Poppies of Flanders is a 1927 British drama film directed by Arthur Maude and starring Jameson Thomas, Eve Gray and Henry Vibart. It was based on a novel by Herman C. McNeile.

Cast
 Jameson Thomas as Jim Brown
 Eve Gray as Beryl Kingwood
 Henry Vibart as Earl of Strangeways
 Gibb McLaughlin as Shorty Bill
 Daisy Campbell as Countess of Strangeways
 Malcolm Tod as Bob Standish
 Cameron Carr as Merrick
 Tubby Phillips as Fat Man

References

Bibliography
 Low, Rachael. History of the British Film, 1918–1929. George Allen & Unwin, 1971.

External links

1927 films
1927 drama films
Films shot at British International Pictures Studios
Films directed by Arthur Maude
British drama films
British silent feature films
British black-and-white films
1920s English-language films
1920s British films
Silent drama films